The 2030 Mediterranean Games, officially known as the XXI Mediterranean Games is a forthcoming international multi-sport event that is scheduled to be held in 2023.

Bidding process
The International Committee of Mediterranean Games launched the bidding process for the 2030 games at a meeting of its Executive Committee held on 10 December 2022 in Pristina, Kosovo.

Potential bids

 - ICMG president Davide Tizzano stated that "Kosovo, together with the neighbouring countries will be ready to organise the Mediterranean Games" following a meeting with the President of Kosovo Vjosa Osmani in December 2022.

References

Mediterranean Games
2030
Mediterranean Games 20230